One Man is a Canadian drama film, released in 1977. Directed by Robin Spry, the film stars Len Cariou as Jason Brady, a television journalist in Montreal who is investigating a chemical leak from a local factory which has poisoned a number of children.

The film, made on a budget of $615,283., had relatively limited theatrical distribution, screening only in Toronto and Ottawa before airing on CBC Television in 1979. It also had a brief theatrical run in New York City, following Cariou's Tony Award-winning performance in Sweeney Todd: The Demon Barber of Fleet Street.

Awards
 ACTRA Awards, Montreal: Film of the Year, 1978
 Film Festival Antwerpen, Antwerp: Second Best Film of the Festival, 1978
 Film Festival Antwerpen, Antwerp: Honorable Mention by the Press Jury, 1978
 28th Canadian Film Awards: Best Original Screenplay - Robin Spry, Peter Pearson & Peter Madden, 1977 
 28th Canadian Film Awards: Best Actor - Len Cariou, 1977
 28th Canadian Film Awards: Best Supporting Actor - Jean Lapointe, 1977
 28th Canadian Film Awards: Best Supporting Actress - Carole Lazare, 1977
 28th Canadian Film Awards: Best Overall Sound - Claude Hazanavicius, 1977
 28th Canadian Film Awards: Best Sound Editing - Les Halman and Ken Page, 1977

It was also nominated, but did not win, for Best Picture, Best Director (Spry), Best Actress (Eastwood) and Best Cinematography (Douglas Kiefer).

References

Works cited

External links
 One Man at the National Film Board of Canada

1977 films
Canadian drama films
Films set in Montreal
National Film Board of Canada films
Films directed by Robin Spry
English-language Canadian films
1970s English-language films
1970s Canadian films